"The Little Voice" is a song by Swedish musician Sahlene from her debut studio album It's Been a While (2003). It was released as the lead single from the album in 2000, by Roadrunner Arcade Music. The song was written and produced by Patrik Berger and Kara DioGuardi. "The Little Voice" experienced minimal commercial success in Sweden, where it peaked at number 51 on the Swedish national record chart.

Release
Although the single received airplay, Sahlene's record company went bankrupt before the release of her debut album, and the album was shelved. But, in 2003 she finally released her debut album It's Been a While, which contained "The Little Voice". The Little Voice, had heavy promotion and an accompanying music video was also released. The music video features Sahlene in a laboratory like set, walking around and scenes of her performing the song is also shown.

Track listings and formats
 CD single
 "The Little Voice"  – 3:11
 "Hush Hush"  – 4:38
 Maxi single
 "The Little Voice"  – 3:11
 "Hush Hush"  – 4:38
 "The Little Voice" (Long 101 Treat) – 4:42
 "The Little Voice" (Longer 101 Treat) – 7:24

Credits and personnel
Credits and personnel are adapted from the It's Been a While album liner notes.
 Sahlene – lead vocals, backing vocals, vocal arrangement
 Patrik Berger – writer, producer, all instruments, programming
 Kara DioGuardi – writer, producer, backing vocals, vocal arrangement
 Bernard Löhr – mixing
 Björn Engelmann – mastering

Charts

Hilary Duff version 

"Little Voice" is a song recorded by American singer Hilary Duff for her second studio album, Metamorphosis (2003). It was released as the third and final single from the album on May 10, 2004 in Australia. The song was produced by Chico Bennett and DioGuardi. The song peaked at number twenty-nine in Australia and also peaked at eighteen in Netherlands.

Music video
The music video for the song was taken from The Girl Can Rock Tour DVD.

Track listing
Australian CD single
"Little Voice" — 3:03
"Party Up" (Dance Remix) — 3:43

European CD single
"Little Voice" — 3:03
"Come Clean" (Cut to the Chase Club Mix – Radio Edit) — 3:43

Charts

Release history

Other version
Mexican pop group RBD recorded a Spanish and Portuguese cover of "The Little Voice", titled "Tu Dulce Voz" and "Sua Doce Voz" (Your Sweet Voice), which is included on their third studio album, Celestial (2006) and third bilingual album, Celestial (Versão Brasil) (2006).

References

External links
 

2000 singles
2000 songs
2004 singles
Hilary Duff songs
RBD songs
Songs written by Kara DioGuardi
Hollywood Records singles
Songs written by Patrik Berger (record producer)